Svenska Sesam is the second Swedish adaptation of the popular US children's series Sesame Street. The series aired at 5:30 p.m. on the channel then called TV2.

Cast

Actors:

 Lill Lindfors
 Magnus Härenstam
 Nils Eklund
 Gunilla Åkesson
 Svante Thuresson
 Lennart Loberg

Muppets and additional characters:

 Ernie and Bert
 Kakmonstret (Cookie Monster)
 Kermit (Kermit the Frog)
 Grover
 Greven (Count von Count)
 Hansson and Fia Jansson (animated characters, developed specifically for this show)

Crew
 "GALA TEATER-manus": Birgitta Götestam and Peter Flack
 Animation: Owe Gustafson
 Music: Anders Ekdahl
 Producer: Lasse Haglund

External links
 Scan of television listing mentioning the show

Sesame Street international co-productions
Television series with live action and animation
Swedish television shows featuring puppetry
Swedish children's television series